Hypertragulidae is an extinct  family of artiodactyl ungulates that lived in North America, Europe, and Asia from the Eocene until the Miocene, living 46.2—13.6 million years ago, existing for about 33 million years.

The Hypertragulidae are basal ruminants that resembled small deer or musk deer in life. However, neither deer, nor musk deer are considered to be closely related to the hypertragulids. Instead, the chevrotains are probably the closest living relatives to these ancient deer-like animals.

Taxonomy
Hypertragulidae was named by Cope (1879). This family was considered paraphyletic by Matthew (1908). It was assigned to Ruminantia by Matthew (1908) and Gregory (1910); to Pecora by Cook (1934); and to Traguloidea by Carroll (1988).

Morphology
Hypertragulidae have tetradactyl front feet and didactyl rear feet, which is specific to this family and no other ruminants.

References

Eocene even-toed ungulates
Oligocene even-toed ungulates
Miocene even-toed ungulates
Serravallian extinctions
Prehistoric mammals of North America
Prehistoric mammals of Europe
Prehistoric mammals of Asia
Eocene first appearances
Miocene extinctions
Prehistoric mammal families